The 2007 Japanese Formula 3 Championship was the 28th edition of the Japanese Formula 3 Championship. It began on 31 March at Fuji and ended on 21 October at Motegi. Local driver Kazuya Oshima took the championship title, winning six from twenty races.

Teams and drivers
 All teams were Japanese-registered. All cars were powered by Bridgestone tyres.

Notes

Race calendar and results

Standings
Points are awarded as follows:

References

External links
 Official Site 

Formula Three
Japanese Formula 3 Championship seasons
Japan
Japanese Formula 3